{{Infobox television station
| callsign               = KABE-CD
| logo                   = KABE39.png
| logo_size              = 250px
| branding               = Univision 39Noticias 39 (newscasts)Noticias 21 (during newscast simulcasts)
| analog                 =
| digital                = 35 (UHF)
| virtual                = 39
| translators            = KUVI-DT 45.2 (26.2 UHF) Bakersfield
| affiliations           = 39.1: Univision (via KFTV from 1989 to 2002, sole affiliation since 2004)
| airdate                = 
| location               = Bakersfield, California
| country                = United States
| callsign_meaning       = Aquí en Bakersfield Estamos
| owner                  = TelevisaUnivision
| licensee               = Univision Bakersfield LLC
| sister_stations        = KUVI-DTKBTF-CD
| former_callsigns       = K52DJ (1989–1998)KSUV-LP (1998–2002)KBTF-LP (2002–2004)KABE-LP (2004–2010)KABE-LD (2010–2013)
| former_affiliations    = Analog/CD1:TeleFutura (2002–2004)CD2:True Crime Network (until 2017)Dark (2017−2019)Court TV (2019−2021)CD3:Bounce TV (until 2019)| former_channel_numbers = Analog:52 (UHF, 1989–1998)39 (UHF, 1998–2010)Digital:39 (UHF, 2010–2019)
| erp                    = 13 kW
| haat                   = 
| facility_id            = 18747
| class                  = CD
| coordinates            = 
| licensing_authority    = FCC
| website                =  
}}KABE-CD (channel 39) is a low-power, Class A television station in Bakersfield, California, United States, broadcasting the Spanish-language Univision network. It is owned and operated by TelevisaUnivision alongside Class A UniMás outlet KBTF-CD (channel 31) and Twist affiliate KUVI-DT (channel 45). The three stations share studios on Truxtun Avenue in the western section of Bakersfield; KABE-CD's transmitter is located atop Mount Adelaide.

In addition to its own digital signal, KABE-CD is simulcast in high definition on the second digital subchannel of KUVI (virtual channel 45.2, UHF channel 26.2) from a separate transmitter atop Mount Adelaide.

HistoryK52DJ launched on July 31, 1989, as a translator of Fresno's Univision station KFTV. It was renamed KSUV-LP and moved to channel 39 in 1998 after Univision purchased UPN affiliate KUZZ-TV (now KUVI-DT) from Buck Owens. It was renamed to KBTF-LP in 2002 during the launch of TeleFutura (now UniMás). It was renamed to KABE-LP''' in 2004 after a callsign swap with the original KABE-CA (channel 31, now KBTF-CD). In 2013, the station obtained Class A status. In 2019, KABE started airing Court TV on its second digital subchannel as part of an agreement between Scripps and Univision for areas where KERO-TV's signal is not easily received.

Technical information

Subchannel

The True Crime affiliation was dropped on September 25, 2017, two weeks after KUVI obtained the affiliation; the 39.2 subchannel went dark until 2019, when it returned to the air with Court TV programming. The Court TV affiliation was dropped in 2021.

References

External links

Univision network affiliates
Court TV affiliates
ABE-CD
Television channels and stations established in 1989
1989 establishments in California
ABE-CD
Low-power television stations in the United States